King is a 2008 Indian Telugu-language action comedy film directed by Sreenu Vaitla from a story written by Kona Venkat and Gopimohan. The film stars Nagarjuna Akkineni, Srihari, Trisha, and Mamta Mohandas. The music of the film is composed by Devi Sri Prasad.

Plot
King hails from a royal family, having taken over the legacy and riches after the death of his father, Raja Ravi Chandra Varma. King has a younger brother Ajay, a mother, a maternal uncle, and his late father's three sisters, who are married. Their husbands are Appaji, Kona Venkat, and Gopi Mohan. The uncles steal money that is for the workers. They make it look as though the employee Chandu is responsible. King believes and fires Chandu. Suddenly, King knew the uncles had hidden the money in their room. He kept quiet because of his aunts.

Before King leaves the airport, this mysterious guy is after King. A few days later, King and Swapna discuss something next to a graveyard. The same mysterious guy from the airport tries to shoot King but misses. King chases the shooter to the graveyard, but the shooter suddenly disappears. Munna calls King's cell phone. King tells Munna that he's in a graveyard. Munna asks if King is OK, to which he says yes. Unfortunately, Swapna shoots King from behind. He sees her face and realizes that she is working with the shooter. Swapna shoots King again. King is presumed dead. Munna tells the police that King went missing. At least one day later, when the police take Munna to a hospital morgue, a dead body looks like King. Munna lies to the police that none of the corpses are King's body. Kona Venkat and Gopi Mohan say that Appaji's responsible for King's disappearance. Appaji escapes, and it is assumed that he is responsible. King's mother believes that her son is safe.

Another story thread is incorporated through the introduction of gangster Bottu Seenu, who falls in love with singer Sravani. Sravani does not care for a wastrel like Bottu Seenu, so he poses as a software engineer named Sarath to impress her. Bottu Seenu meets the real Sarath. Sravani's elder brother Gnaneswar knows Bottu Seenu, but he would get mad at Bottu Seenu for loving Sravani. Bottu Seenu pretends to be Sarath, who wears a tie, shirt, and pants. Gnaneswar gets fooled too. The real Sarath imposes Bottu Seenu in front of a cop by mistake. The cop mistakes Sarath for Bottu Seenu and beats him up badly in a hilarious way.

Meanwhile, Appaji sends goons to look for King, thinking he's still alive. They run into Bottu Seenu, who thrashes them. Appaji proposes a deal to Bottu Seenu and asks him to pose as King and return to the palace. After Munna informed King's family that King had disappeared, Appaji tried to escape, but he got picked up by Munna. Munna gave a picture of King's corpse, time, and date to Appaji. Appaji had nothing to do with King's murder. Once Bottu Seenu gets access to King's bank accounts, Appaji can repay his debts because he borrowed a lot of money from goons. Sravani and Gnaneswar mistake Bottu Seenu for Sharath again. They accompany Bottu Seenu to the palace. The first twist: Swapna is none other than Chandu's daughter, but Chandu committed suicide because nobody believed that he did not steal the money; Bhagath Seth hired Swapna and the mysterious shooter; the mysterious shooter is Baba, and Swapna's real name is Pooja.

Bhagath hires Pooja to kill King's brother Ajay. Ajay brings his girlfriend Pooja to his home. Suddenly, Bottu Seenu attacks Pooja, but a few seconds later, he has no idea what happened. Gnaneshwar believes King's spirit came to get revenge and control Bottu Seenu. Bottu Seenu gets engaged to Sravani. Pooja knows that it is not the King who is living in the palace right now. Bhagath hires a bunch of guys, including Baba, to dress up in black and kill King's impostor and Ajay in the palace during the night. Bhagath Seth thinks that he shouldn't trust girls, including Pooja. Bottu Seenu is controlled by King's spirit and saves Ajay from Pooja. Another twist is that Ajay met Pooja right before she killed King. She feels Ajay depends too much on his brother, so he tells her to kill King. The third twist: Bottu Seenu/Sharath is revealed as King.

Munna captures Baba, who reveals his motive for planning to kill Swapna, who is Chandu's daughter too. Pooja said what happened that day but doesn't kill King. The father and friends who cared for Bottu Seenu were Munna's people. Munna's real name is Bottu Seenu. King says that Ajay's mistake is unforgivable. King's family members are feeling sad, so he decides to leave. He dies in an explosion that takes place in his car. King's mother leaves and doesn't want anyone to look for her. Everyone else is probably still mad at Ajay. The fourth twist is that King is still alive.

He reveals his plan only to Shravani: King asks Bhagath's henchman (who kidnapped Kittu at the beginning of the movie) to tell him about Bhagath's evil plans. After King got shot, Munna took him to the hospital. Swapna's details were fake so they couldn't find her. He decided to play this double role drama. Bhagath's henchman/King's informer reveals the shooter is working for Bhagath, too but didn't find details about Swapna. When King met his uncles again, none of them had anything to do with it. King realized that Kittu was behind everything. King's informer blew up King's car after he escaped. This was King's plan too. The informer puts a bomb inside Bhagath's car too, so King talks to Bhagath on the phone before Bhagath dies. King pretends to be Sarath in front of everyone else.

The final twist: Bottu Seenu/Munna's father and friends were responsible for messing up lights and pulling tables with rope in King's palace. They did it to make it look like King's spirit came for revenge.

Cast

 Nagarjuna Akkineni as Raja Chandra Pratap "King" Verma / Boddu Seenu / Sharath
 Srihari as Gnaneshwar Bhai  
 Trisha as Sravani
 Mamta Mohandas as Swapna / Pooja
 Brahmanandam as Jayasurya
 Sunil as Sharath
 Chandra Mohan as Narayana
 Deepak as Yuvaraja Ajay Varma “Ajay” 
 Jaya Prakash Reddy as Appaji
 Krishna Bhagawan as Kona Venkat
 Sayaji Shinde as Gopi Mohan
 Geetha as King's mother 
 Dharmavarapu Subramanyam as King's uncle
 Sudha as King's aunt
 Madhu Shalini as King's cousin
 M. S. Narayana as Sravani's uncle
 Surya as Swapna's father
 Ajay as Coal Kittu
 Supreeth as Munna / Bottu Seenu
 AVS as Manager
 Venu Madhav as Tension Bonda
 Radha Kumari as Sarath's grandmother
 Raavi Kondala Rao as Sarath's grandfather
 Abhinaya as Sravani's friend
 Srinivasa Reddy as Sai Kishore, Jayasurya's PA
 Fish Venkat as Gnaneswar's henchmen
 Duvvasi Mohan as Panthulu
 Jeeva as Wizard
 Master Bharath as Master
 Prudhviraj
 Surekha Vani 
 Gundu Sudarshan
 Narsing Yadav 
 Banerjee
 Sravan
 Gautam Raju 
 Jenny
 Bharath Dhabolkar as Bhagath Seth
 Chitram Seenu as Bottu Sennu's henchman
 Giridhar as Bottu Sennu's henchman
 Rama Chandar as Bottu Sennu's henchman
 Ranam Venu as Bottu Sennu's henchman
 Apoorva as King's aunt
 Srilalitha as Sravani's friend
 Rajitha as Sravani's aunt
 Bharat as Appaji's son
 Amith as Bhagath's son
 Chitti as DCP 
 Devadas Kanakala as Secretariat Gopal Rao 
 Chitraleka as Anchor
 Tarzan as Rowdy
 Ramajogayya Sastry as himself
Cameo appearances
 Genelia D'Souza in the song "Nuvvu Ready Nenu Ready"
 Anushka Shetty in the song "Nuvvu Ready Nenu Ready"
 Charmy Kaur in the song "Nuvvu Ready Nenu Ready"
 Priyamani in the song "Nuvvu Ready Nenu Ready"
 Kamna Jethmalani in the song "Nuvvu Ready Nenu Ready"
 Sneha Ullal in the song "Nuvvu Ready Nenu Ready"
 Kelly Dorjee in the title song "K-I-N-G"

Soundtrack

Music was composed by Devi Sri Prasad. The tune of "O Manmadhuda" is reused from title track of Kannada movie Sangama (film). Music was released on ADITYA Music Company. 
The following actors appeared in the film's "Nuvvu Ready Nenu Ready" song segment: Anushka Shetty, Charmy Kaur, Priyamani, Genelia D'Souza, Sneha Ullal and Kamna Jethmalani.

Release
The film was dubbed into Hindi as King No. 1 in 2010  and into Tamil as Pudhukottai Azhagan and in Malayalam as King and it was dubbed in Bhojpuri as Main Hoon King.

Reception 
The Times of India gave the film 3 stars out of 5 and wrote: "Being a star-centric film, director Sreenu Vytla sensibly blends action into his comedy plot and succeeds to quite an extent, barring a few lapses. However, the director's forte has always been fun-centric movies and again he doesn't disappoint on that score." Idlebrain.com rated 3/5 and opined that the film's screenplay is "extremely complicated" and "The director could not evenly distribute the twists in the film."

References

External links
 

2008 films
2000s Telugu-language films
Films directed by Srinu Vaitla
Films scored by Devi Sri Prasad
Films with screenplays by Kona Venkat
2008 action comedy films
Indian action comedy films